Akropong is a town in south Ghana.

Akropong may also refer to:
Akropong (Ghana parliament constituency)
Akropong–Akuapem, a kingdom-state
Wassa-Akropong, a town